Milad Vaziri Teymoorlooei (born 9 June 1988 in Tabriz, Iran) is an Iranian archer. He competed in the individual event at the 2012, and 2020 Summer Olympics.

References 

Iranian male archers
1988 births
Living people
Archers at the 2012 Summer Olympics
Archers at the 2020 Summer Olympics
Olympic archers of Iran
Archers at the 2010 Asian Games
Archers at the 2018 Asian Games
Asian Games competitors for Iran